Lasiopetalum discolor, commonly known as coast velvet-bush, is a species of flowering plant in the family Malvaceae and is endemic to coastal areas of southern Australia. It is an erect, spreading or sprawling shrub with hairy stems, oblong to egg-shaped leaves and pink or white flowers.

Description

Taxonomy
Lasiopetalum discolor was first formally described in 1836 by William Jackson Hooker in the Companion to the Botanical Magazine from specimens collected by James Backhouse "on Prince Seal Island, Basse's Straits". The specific epithet (discolor) refers to the upper surface of the leaves being a darker green than the lower surface.

Distribution and habitat
This lasiopetalum grows in sand on coastal dunes and limestone along the south coast of Western Australia and South Australia, on Bass Strait islands and the north-west coast of Tasmania.

Conservation status
Lasiopetalum discolor is listed as "rare" under the Tasmanian Government Threatened Species Protection Act 1995.

References

discolor
Malvales of Australia
Flora of Western Australia
Flora of South Australia
Flora of Tasmania
Plants described in 1836
Taxa named by William Jackson Hooker